Titanfall: Assault was a real-time strategy video game in the Titanfall series for mobile platforms in the style of Clash Royale. It was developed by Particle City and Respawn Entertainment from Electronic Arts, published by Nexon, and released for iOS and Android in August 2017. More titles are expected from Nexon, EA and Respawn's 2015 mobile game partnership.

All servers for Titanfall: Assault were shut down on July 30, 2018 and was removed from Google Play one day later on July 31, 2018.

References

Further reading

External links 
 

2017 video games
Nexon games
Respawn Entertainment games
IOS games
Android (operating system) games
Real-time strategy video games
Multiplayer video games
Titanfall
Video games developed in the United States